Lyndsay Cheyenne Wall (born May 12, 1985 in Visalia, California) is an American ice hockey player. She won a silver medal at the 2002 Winter Olympics and a bronze medal at the 2006 Winter Olympics.

She graduated from Churchville-Chili High School in the Rochester, New York area in 2003.

External links
Lyndsay Wall's U.S. Olympic Team bio

1985 births
American women's ice hockey defensemen
Ice hockey players from California
Ice hockey players at the 2002 Winter Olympics
Ice hockey players at the 2006 Winter Olympics
Living people
Medalists at the 2002 Winter Olympics
Medalists at the 2006 Winter Olympics
Minnesota Golden Gophers women's ice hockey players
Olympic bronze medalists for the United States in ice hockey
Olympic silver medalists for the United States in ice hockey
People from Visalia, California